West Wiltshire was a local government district in Wiltshire, England, formed on 1 April 1974, further to the Local Government Act 1972, as a merger of the former urban districts of Bradford-on-Avon, Melksham, Trowbridge, Warminster and Westbury, along with Bradford and Melksham Rural District and the Warminster and Westbury Rural District.

There were five towns in the district, Bradford on Avon, Melksham, Trowbridge, Warminster and Westbury, each surrounded by rural parishes. About two-thirds of the district's population was in its five towns.

The district council was based at purpose-built offices in Bradley Road, Trowbridge. It was abolished on 1 April 2009 as part of the 2009 structural changes to local government in England, when its functions were taken over by the new Wiltshire Council unitary authority.

District Council

West Wiltshire District Council had forty-four members, all elected together for a four-year term of office. The first elections were held in 1973 and the last in 2007.

Political control 

Initially, in 1973, the district council had no overall control. The Conservatives took control during the 1980s, and then the Liberal Democrats from 1991 to 2003. At the West Wiltshire district elections of May 2003, 19 Conservatives, 19 Liberal Democrats, two Labour members and four Independents were elected. In this hung council, an administration of Conservatives and Independents led by Councillor A. G. Phillips OBE (Independent) held office from May 2003 to May 2005, followed by a coalition of Liberal Democrats and Independents led by Councillor Sarah Content (Liberal Democrat), from May 2005 to May 2007. At the district elections on 3 May 2007, 26 Conservatives, 14 Liberal Democrats, and four Independents were elected as members of the Council, giving the Conservatives overall control for the first time since 1990.
The Conservatives appointed Councillor Graham Payne (Conservative) as Leader and Councillor A. G. Phillips OBE (by now also a Conservative) as Deputy Leader.

Parliamentary representation

At the parliamentary level, most of the district of West Wiltshire was in the Westbury constituency, with the remaining two parishes coming under Devizes. Throughout the district's existence, both seats were held by Conservative Members of Parliament, latterly Andrew Murrison (Westbury) and Michael Ancram (Devizes).

Settlements
Populated places in West Wiltshire included:

Ashton Gifford
Atworth 
Bishopstrow 
Boyton
Bradford on Avon
Bratton 
Broughton Gifford
Bulkington
Chapmanslade
Chitterne
Codford
Corsley
Coulston
Dilton Marsh
Edington
Heytesbury
Holt
Horningsham
Imber
Keevil
Knook
Limpley Stoke
Longleat
Melksham
Melksham Without
Monkton Farleigh
North Bradley
Norton Bavant
Old Dilton
Semington
Sherrington
Southwick
South Wraxall
Staverton
Steeple Ashton
Sutton Veny
Trowbridge
Upton Lovell
Upton Scudamore
Warminster
West Ashton
Westbury
Winsley
Yarnbrook

See also
Wiltshire County Council

References

English districts abolished in 2009
Former non-metropolitan districts of Wiltshire